The Northern New England Corridor is one of ten federally designated higher-speed rail corridors in the United States. The proposed  corridor would have allowed passenger trains to travel from Boston, Massachusetts, to Montreal, Quebec, Canada, in about 4 1/2 hours. 

In 2004, Congress extended the Northern New England High Speed Rail Corridor from Boston to Springfield, Massachusetts, and Albany, New York, and from Springfield to New Haven, Connecticut. The Boston-Springfield-Albany route would provide a link to the Empire Corridor.

Background
, there is no direct passenger rail service between Boston and Montreal. Service from Boston to Portland takes about 2 hours 30 minutes via the Downeaster. There are no trains to Auburn. Service from Boston to Albany via Springfield takes just over 5 hours on the daily Lake Shore Limited.

See also 
 High-speed rail in the United States
 High-speed rail in Canada
 North–South Rail Link

References

External links 
Northern New England Intercity Rail Initiative - MassDOT

High-speed railway lines in the United States
Transportation in New England
Transport in Montreal
Proposed railway lines in Massachusetts